The America Zone was one of the two regional zones of the 1946 Davis Cup.

5 teams entered the America Zone, with the winner going on to compete in the Inter-Zonal Final against the winner of the Europe Zone. The United States defeated Mexico in the final, and went on to face Sweden in the Inter-Zonal Final.

Draw

Quarterfinals

United States vs. Philippines

Semifinals

Canada vs. Mexico

Final

United States vs. Mexico

References

External links
Davis Cup official website

Davis Cup Americas Zone
America Zone
Davis Cup